Rosaire L'Italien was the interim leader of the New Brunswick New Democratic Party in 2017. Previously, he had been a journalist for Radio-Canada-owned station CBAFT-DT in Moncton for 42 years, covering New Brunswick and Atlantic Canada before retiring in 2015. In the 2015 federal election, he was the New Democratic Party's candidate in Madawaska—Restigouche where he placed second, ahead of incumbent Conservative MP Bernard Valcourt. On January 9, 2017, he was appointed interim leader of the provincial party by the party's executive following the resignation of Dominic Cardy. He remained leader until August 10, 2017, when Jennifer McKenzie was chosen as the new NDP leader.

Electoral record

References

Acadian people
New Brunswick New Democratic Party leaders
Living people
Journalists from New Brunswick
Canadian television reporters and correspondents
New Brunswick candidates for Member of Parliament
Year of birth missing (living people)